In military terms, 112th Division or 112th Infantry Division may refer to:

 112th Division (People's Republic of China)
 112th Infantry Division (Wehrmacht)
 112th Division (Imperial Japanese Army)
 112th Guards Rifle Division (Soviet Union, post World War II)